WVBR-FM (93.5 FM) is a commercial, student-owned and volunteer-run college radio station that broadcasts to Ithaca, New York and surrounding areas. It operates at 3 kilowatts from a transmitter on Hungerford Hill, in Ithaca. Prior to 2016, WVBR had a translator on 105.5 FM.  The website WVBR.com provides an additional web-based stream.  WVBR purchased, remodeled and relocated to a new studio in Collegetown, located at 604 E. Buffalo Street.  A ribbon-cutting event was held on March 15, 2014, where the new building was named the Olbermann-Corneliess Studios, after Keith Olbermann's father, Ted, and his close friend and alumnus, Glenn Corneliess.

Organization
WVBR is a commercial radio station that it is owned, operated and managed by Cornell University students who comprise the non-profit Cornell Media Guild. The station is ad-supported and independent of the university. WVBR and the Guild are a training ground for students interested in media and broadcasting, as well as a serious commercial competitor in the Ithaca radio market.

There are also community members, of all ages, who are involved with the station. Student and volunteer staff members are, for the most part, unpaid. Some staff earn commissions on time sales or are paid a stipend to help operate the station during the summer and other times when Cornell classes are not in session.

WVBR is very involved in the Ithaca and Tompkins County community. The station features a "Community Calendar" segment twice daily, where non-profit organizations can send bulletins of their events to be read over the air during the morning and afternoon. WVBR also does remote broadcasts from a variety of locations in Ithaca, including the Ithaca Farmer's Market, Ithaca-area concerts, and local businesses around town. WVBR also sponsors local charitable and cultural events.

History
WVBR's history goes back to 1935 when the Cornell Radio Guild was formed (incorporated in 1941), as a Cornell student organization that produced radio programs that aired on WESG, the forerunner of WHCU, in Ithaca.  In the early 1940s, the Guild started a network of its own low power AM "carrier-current" transmitters in the dormitories. For a time, the signal of those transmitters was powerful enough, and connected to enough of the regional power grid, that the signal was widely heard beyond campus. A hoax broadcast in the early 1950s resulted in the FCC ordering the Guild to take steps to restrict the reach of the signal to the immediate campus area. It was at this point, that the Guild began a search for a suitable frequency on either AM or the newly emerging FM to conduct a genuine regional broadcast service. That search was successful in 1957, when a construction permit was issued by the FCC to allow the Guild to build and operate an FM station, first at 101.7 MHz. But before broadcasts were begun, the specified operating frequency was changed to 93.5 MHz, and WVBR-FM has broadcast on that frequency ever since.

The FCC-licensed FM station first went on the air in June 1958, though the WVBR call letters had already been in use for years on the Guild's AM "carrier-current" broadcasts, which could be received only on campus.   The call letters originally stood for "Voice of the Big Red", referring to the Cornell Big Red athletic teams.  But the station de-emphasized that connection over the years as it carved out an identity independent of the university, and as the university's sports broadcasts were generally carried by WHCU, a commercial station that Cornell owned for many years. (This has changed to a degree in recent years as WVBR has become the originating station for sponsored broadcasts of some major Cornell sports, including football, basketball and hockey.)

In its early years, WVBR-FM's musical programming was mainly classical, while its AM carrier-current side carried popular music. WVBR-FM switched to rock and popular music in 1968 in a format change billed and promoted as "the FM Revolution." The station greatly expanded its audience, especially off campus, initially with a sound that blended hit music, progressive album cuts, and a sound that anticipated in many respects both album rock and adult contemporary radio formats of subsequent years. By the early to mid-1970s its format had evolved to progressive rock radio, similar to pioneering rock stations like WNEW-FM in New York, WMMS in Cleveland, KSAN-FM in San Francisco, and nearby WCMF in Rochester. In later years the station's format evolved toward more tightly controlled, hit-oriented playlists, mirroring the larger trend in FM radio programming influenced by national programmers like Lee Abrams and Kent Burkhart. It also became heavily involved in live music, promoting its own series of concerts at local venues like the Strand Theater, many of which were broadcast live.

The station's commercial success peaked in the late 1970s and mid-1980s. It was adversely affected in the later 1980s and 1990s by several factors, including changes in the local economy; New York State raising its drinking age to 21, a blow to the radio station's nightclub and bar advertisers; several new stations brought into the Ithaca market via translators and cable; and deregulation of the radio industry, which resulted in most local competitors being taken over by a single chain owner.

A format change to contemporary hit radio took place in the early 1980s, led by then-Program Director Kathy Jassy. The station was branded "FM93" and enjoyed commercial success. This continued under then-Program Director and on-air personality (and current iHeartMedia National Programming Platforms President) Tom Poleman, as well his successor, Program Director and on-air personality (and current Sirius XM Radio Host and programmer) Jessica Ettinger, the latter two under the leadership of station general manager (and now Coleman Insights President) Warren Kurtzman.  But after key personnel graduated from Cornell in the late 1980s, the new format eventually faded in audience appeal, especially with WVBR's traditional 18-34 core.

By 1989, under music director (and now Sr. VP/GM of Music Programming for Sirius XM radio) Steve Blatter, the station moved back to album-oriented rock, and the format struggled. Structural problems with the station's long-time studio building in the Collegetown neighborhood of Ithaca, which forced WVBR to relocate its studios and offices in 2000, also proved to be both a financial and administrative burden for a time. The station's prospects improved over the following decade with a series of innovations, including the introduction of popular new youth-oriented VBR After Dark programming on weekday evenings and a special focus on music by local artists. Among other ventures, WVBR developed an online streaming station, CornellRadio.com, with eclectic programming aimed specifically at student listeners, and launched its own recording label, Electric Buffalo Records. 

In 2013, the corporation changed its name form The Cornell Radio Guild, Inc. to The Cornell Media Guild, Inc., reflecting the widening scope of its activities and ambitions.

To increase its appeal to younger listeners and compete more effectively in what had become a crowded radio dial, WVBR changed its weekday music format in 2018 to alternative, and changed its brand identity from Real Rock Radio to Ithaca's Alternative. On weekends, the station continues to offer a lineup of specialty programs that have attracted strong local followings for decades, including "Bound For Glory" (folk), "Salt Creek" (country), "Rockin' Remnants" (oldies) and "Last Exit for the Lost" (metal) among others.

Locations

History
In the past the station has broadcast from studios at Willard Straight Hall, the university's main student union; a station-owned building at 227 Linden Avenue; and rented space at 957-B Mitchell Street near East Hill Plaza.

Current location
In 2014, the station purchased a new home closer to its student staff base in Collegetown at 604 E. Buffalo Street. The building, formerly the home of the Crossroads Community Center and now known as the Olbermann-Corneliess Studios, is named after Ted Olbermann, the father of the station's biggest donor, Keith Olbermann, and Keith's close friend and fellow station alumnus, Glenn Corneliess. The main production studio, known as the George E. Beine '61 Studio A, houses the station's vinyl record library and honors alumni from the 1958-68 Classical/Jazz era of the station.

Weekday programming
The station's playlist during the week consists of a variety of alternative rock. During the day, the format is a mix of alternative rock, modern rock, mainstream rock, and active rock.

WVBR features student DJs on weekdays. Typically, all or most of them are students at Cornell University, although a few may hail from other colleges around the area. During periods when Cornell is closed, students and alumni sometimes staff shifts remotely.

Regular weekday features
There are several staples of WVBR's normal programming. Tompkins County Trivia airs every weekday after the 8:00 a.m. newscast. In this segment, the DJ asks a trivia question on a topic local interest, with the first caller to correctly identify the answer winning a prize. Other regularly occurring daily weekday segments include Today in Rock History and The WVBR Concert Log.  The 93-Second Sports Shot, an opinion piece covering sports, airs weekdays during the 6 p.m. newscast.

Weekend programming
The station features a number of specialty programs on weekends, some focused on specific genres of rock music or its roots, and others on public affairs or sports.

The best known of the station's weekend programs is Bound For Glory, a long-running folk music showcase with a national reputation. Broadcast every Sunday night since 1967, the program is the longest-running live folk music broadcast in North America; it features a mix of recordings and (most weeks) live performances from a coffeehouse on the Cornell campus. Phil Shapiro has been the program's host since its inception.

Other long-running specialty programs on the station, begun in the 1960s, include "Nonesuch" (eclectic), "The Salt Creek Show" (country music); and "Rockin' Remnants" (oldies). Each has seen a succession of hosts and occasional changes in time slot.

Prominent alumni
Many WVBR student staff members have gone on to significant careers in broadcasting, journalism, and related fields, including:
Steve Blatter - senior vice president and general manager of Music Programming at SiriusXM
William B. Briggs - sports and entertainment law expert; vice president for arbitration and litigation for the National Football League (NFL)
Urie Bronfenbrenner - influential psychologist whose work led to the development of the Head Start early childhood program
Joyce Brothers - psychologist, television personality, and columnist; "the mother of television psychology"
 Zachary W. Carter - corporation counsel for New York City; former United States Attorney for the Eastern District of New York
Joel Chaseman - senior executive at Westinghouse Broadcasting Company (now part of CBS) who pioneered the all-news radio format and implemented it successfully in 1965 at WINS (AM)
 G. Emerson Cole - radio and television producer; hosted longest-running big band radio program in history
Pam Coulter - CBS News Washington, D.C. correspondent
Edward D. Eddy - president of Chatham College and the University of Rhode Island
 Jessica Ettinger - Anchor, 1010 WINS New York, voice of the New York City Subway on the 4, 5, and 6 trains
 John Ettinger - CEO, The Talent Associates, instrumental in the careers of Shania Twain, Sugarland, Billy Currington, Emerson Drive, Blackjack Billy
 Hal Fishman - Los Angeles television news anchor; longest-running news anchor in the history of American television; alleged inspiration for Kent Brockman on The Simpsons
Tony Geiss - producer, screenwriter, and songwriter who wrote for Sesame Street for 28 years, including writing "Elmo's Song" and creating Abby Cadabby
 Will Gluck - film director, screenwriter, and producer, such as Easy A and Friends with Benefits
Jordan Gremli - Head of Artist & Fan Development at Spotify 
 Robert S. Harrison - CEO of Clinton Global Initiative; Cornell University Board of Trustees chairman
 Phil Karn - wireless data networking protocols & security engineer; inventor of Karn's Algorithm
 Richard C. Koch - developed and patented the first transistor radio, the Regency TR-1
 Lee Kranefuss - investment manager and entrepreneur
Warren Kurtzman - President, media research firm Coleman Insights
 Tim Minton - television journalist, media executive, founder of Zazoom Media Group
 John Moody - executive editor and executive vice president of Fox News, former CEO of NewsCore
 John Morales - award-winning meteorologist
Keith Olbermann - sports and political commentator at ESPN, MSNBC, and Current TV; former host of Countdown with Keith Olbermann
Bill Pidto - sports journalist; MSG Network anchor 
Tom Poleman - president of National Programming Platforms at iHeartMedia
 Brigitte Quinn - anchor, WCBS radio New York 
Christopher Reeve - film actor known for playing Superman 
 Wallace A. Ross - advertising executive; founder of the Clio Awards 
Jon Rubinstein - senior vice president at Apple, Inc. and chairman of Palm, Inc.; instrumental in development of the iPod
Kathy Savitt - Executive, STX Entertainment, Hollywood. Former Chief Marketing Officer at Yahoo!; founder and former CEO of Lockerz
Todd Schnitt - nationally syndicated conservative talk radio host; co-host of Len Berman & Todd Schnitt on WOR radio New York
Melville Shavelson - Academy Award-winning screenwriter, director, and producer
Ryan Silbert - award-winning filmmaker and producer
Kate Snow - television correspondent for Dateline and Rock Center with Brian Williams; Good Morning America co-anchor 
Whit Watson - former SportsCenter anchor

References

External links
 

 WVBR Alumni Pre-1967 - History and Memorabilia

Radio stations established in 1958
VBR-FM
Mass media in Ithaca, New York
Cornell University
Alternative rock radio stations in the United States
1958 establishments in New York (state)